KLWB may refer to:

 KLWB (TV), a television station (channel 17, virtual 50) licensed to serve New Iberia, Louisiana, United States
 KLWB-FM, a radio station (103.7 FM) licensed to serve Carencro, Louisiana